The Victoria Derby, also known as the Penfolds Victoria Derby, is a Victoria Racing Club Group 1 Thoroughbred horse race for three-year-olds held under Set Weights conditions over a distance of 2,500 metres at Flemington Racecourse, in Melbourne, Australia scheduled annually on the first day of the Melbourne Cup Carnival. Total prize money for the race is A$2,000,000.

History
Originally run at a distance of  miles, in 1972 it was changed to 2,400 metres to conform to the metric system. It was changed again in 1973 to its present distance of 2,500 metres.

First run in 1855, the first three editions were won by fillies but the last time a filly won was in 1923 when Frances Tressady claimed victory. In its history, only one horse has ever won the Victoria Derby more than once. Fireworks accomplished the feat, winning back-to-back runnings in November 1867 and again in 1868 after a change of the race date to New Year's Day. Between 1931 and 1956 geldings were not permitted to compete.

Three horses have won their first race with a win in the Victoria Derby. In 1883, the New Zealand-bred horse Martini Henry won the Victoria Derby at his first start. Fire Oak in 1990, Redding in 1992 and Preferment in 2014 are the only other maidens to win the Victoria Derby.

In 2005, Clare Lindop became the first female jockey to ride in the Victoria Derby and became the first female to win in 2008. Gai Waterhouse became the first woman to train a winner when Nothin' Leica Dane won the 1995 running.

Distance
1855–1971 - 1 miles (~2400 metres)
1972 – 2400 metres
1973 onwards -  2500 metres

Grade
1855–1978 -  Principal Race
1979 onwards - Group 1

1933 & 1954 racebooks

Gallery of noted winners

Records

Time record: (at current 2,500 metres distance)
 2:33.60 - Star Of The Realm (1991)

Most wins by a jockey:
 8 - Bobbie Lewis (1900, 1901, 1904, 1908, 1912, 1914, 1921, 1927)

Most wins by a trainer:
 8 - James Scobie : (1900, 1901, 1903, 1904, 1908, 1912, 1927, 1937)

Social attraction

While the major focus of AAMI Victoria Derby Day is the racing (since it is the only race day in Australia where each and every race has Group Status), in recent years the annual Fashions on the Field held on the fourth and last day of the Melbourne Cup Carnival celebrations have shared the limelight. 
Derby Day has become Men's Day in the Fashion Stakes, and every year increasing numbers of fashionable gentlemen competing for prizes and a spot in the social columns.  Traditionally black and white are worn on this day by women and morning dress by men.  The flower of the day is a blue cornflower. The idea of wearing a cornflower on Derby Day was introduced in 1962 by Mrs Sheelah Wood, wife of prominent VRC committeeman of the time, Mr Samuel Richard Creswick Wood.
The 2006 Victoria Derby drew the event's largest crowd, with 129,069 in attendance.

Attendance

2021 – 5,000 (restricted attendance due to the COVID-19 pandemic)
2020 – 0 (no attendance due to COVID-19 pandemic restrictions)
2019 – 80,214
2018 – 91,194
2017 – 87,526
2016 – 90,136
2015 – 85,943
2014 – 90,244
2013 – 95,223
2012 – 98,823
2011 – 92,336
2010 – 90,361
2009 – 108,178
2008 – 117,776
2007 – 115,705
2006 – 129,089
2005 – 115,660
2004 – 115,542
2003 – 97,059
2002 – 101,898
2001 – 93,029
2000 – 92,581
1999 – 76,514
1998 – 75,805
1997 – 64,528
1996 – 64,099
1995 – 60,404
1994 – 54,467
1993 – 49,029
1992 – 45,729
1991 – 46,781
1990 – 47,497
1989 – 47,226
1988 – 44,848
1987 – 41,878
1986 – 42,824
1985 – 40,522
1984 – 39,771
1983 – 40,017
1982 – 42,519
1981 – 39,729
1980 – 38,032

Winners

 2022 - Manzoice
 2021 - Hitotsu
 2020 - Johnny Get Angry
 2019 - Warning
 2018 - Extra Brut
 2017 - Ace High
 2016 - Prized Icon
2015 - Tarzino
2014 - Preferment
2013 - Polanski
2012 - Fiveandahalfstar
2011 - Sangster
2010 - Lion Tamer
2009 - Monaco Consul
2008 - Rebel Raider
2007 - Kibbutz
2006 - Efficient
2005 - Benicio
2004 - Plastered
2003 - Elvstroem
2002 - Helenus
2001 - Amalfi
2000 - Hit The Roof
1999 - Blackfriars
1998 - Arena
1997 - Second Coming
1996 - Portland Player
1995 - Nothin' Leica Dane
1994 - Blevic
1993 - Mahogany
1992 - Redding
1991 - Star Of The Realm
1990 - Fire Oak
1989 - Stylish Century
1988 - King's High
1987 - Omnicorp
1986 - Raveneaux
1985 - Handy Proverb
1984 - Red Anchor
1983 - Bounty Hawk
1982 - Grosvenor
1981 - Brewery Boy
1980 - Sovereign Red
1979 - Big Print
1978 - Dulcify
1977 - Stormy Rex
1976 - Unaware
1975 - Galena Boy
1974 - Haymaker
1973 - Taj Rossi
1972 - Dayana
1971 - Classic Mission
1970 - Silver Sharpe
1969 - Daryl's Joy
1968 - Always There
1967 - Savoy
1966 - Khalif
1965 - Tobin Bronze
1964 - Royal Sovereign
1963 - Craftsman
1962 - Coppelius
1961 - New Statesman
1960 - Sky High
1959 - Travel Boy
1958 - Sir Blink
1957 - Tulloch
1956 - Monte Carlo
1955 - Sailor's Guide
1954 - Pride Of Egypt
1953 - Prince Morvi
1952 - Advocate
1951 - Hydrogen
1950 - Alister
1949 - Delta
1948 - Comic Court
1947 - Beau Gem
1946 - Prince Standard
1945 - Magnificent
1944 - San Martin
1943 - Precept
1942 - Great Britain
1941 - Skipton
1940 - Lucrative
1939 - Reading
1938 - Nuffield
1937 - Hua
1936 - Talking
1935 - Feldspar
1934 - Theo
1933 - Hall Mark 
1932 - Liberal
1931 - Johnnie Jason
1930 - Balloon King
1929 - Phar Lap
1928 - Strephon
1927 - Trivalve
1926 - Rampion
1925 - Manfred
1924 - Spearfelt
1923 - Frances Tressady
1922 - Whittier
1921 - Furious
1920 - Salitros
1919 - Richmond Main
1918 - Eusebius
1917 - Biplane
1916 - Wolaroi
1915 - Patrobas
1914 - Carlita
1913 - Beragoon
1912 - Wolawa
1911 - Wilari
1910 - Beverage
1909 - Prince Foote
1908 - Alawa
1907 - Mountain King
1906 - Poseidon
1905 - Lady Wallace
1904 - Sylvanite
1903 - F.J.A
1902 - Abundance
1901 - Hautvilliers
1900 - Maltster
1899 - Merriwee
1898 - Cocos
1897 - Amberite
1896 - Newhaven
1895 - Wallace
1894 - The Harvester
1893 - Carnage
1892 - Carmoola
1891 - Strathmore
1890 - The Admiral
1889 - Dreadnought
1888 - Ensign
1887 - The Australian Peer
1886 - Trident
1885 - Nordenfeldt
1884 - Rufus
1883 - Martini Henry
1882 - Navigator
1881 - Darebin
1880 - Grand Flaneur
1879 - Suwarrow
1878 - Wellington
1877 - Chester
1876 - Briseis
1875 - Robin Hood
1874 - Melbourne
1873 - Lapidist
1872 - Loup Garou
1871 - Miss Jessie
1870 - Florence
1869 - Charon
1869 - My Dream (run New Year's Day)
1868 - Fireworks (run New Year's Day)
1867 - Fireworks
1866 - Sea Gull
1865 - Angler
1864 - Lantern
1863 - Oriflamme
1862 - Barwon
1861 - Camden
1860 - Flying Colours
1859 - Buzzard
1858 - Brownlock
1857 - Tricolor
1856 - Flying Doe
1855 - Rose Of May

See also

 List of Australian Group races
 Group races
 Thoroughbred racing in Australia
 Melbourne Spring Racing Carnival
 White shift dress of Jean Shrimpton

References

External links 
Victoria Derby Homepage (Official)
Everything you need to know on Victoria Derby

Flat horse races for three-year-olds
Group 1 stakes races in Australia
Flemington Racecourse